Tracey Wheeler (born 26 September 1967) is an Australian former football goalkeeper who played for the Australia women's national soccer team at the 2000 Summer Olympics.

See also
 Australia at the 2000 Summer Olympics

References

External links
 

1967 births
Living people
Australian women's soccer players
Place of birth missing (living people)
Footballers at the 2000 Summer Olympics
Olympic soccer players of Australia
Women's association football goalkeepers
Australia women's international soccer players
1995 FIFA Women's World Cup players
1999 FIFA Women's World Cup players